Agios Dimitrios is a village and a community of the Katerini municipality. Before the 2011 local government reform, it was part of the municipality of Petra, of which it was a municipal district. The 2011 census recorded 627 inhabitants in the village.

References

Populated places in Pieria (regional unit)